Un Natale stupefacente is a 2014 Italian comedy film written and directed  by Volfango De Biasi. It grossed $7,015,989 at the Italian box office.

Plot 
Lillo and Greg are two brothers who have to look after their little grandson just during the Christmas holidays. In fact the child's parents are arrested for cultivation of marijuana, and a social worker tries to block the custody of the little boy, because he mistakes Lillo and Greg for homosexuals!

Cast 
  
 Lillo as Remo
 Greg as Oscar
 Ambra Angiolini as Genny
 Paola Minaccioni as Marisa
 Paolo Calabresi as Giustino
 Niccolò Calvagna as Matteo
 Francesco Montanari as Belotti
 Riccardo De Filippis as Randelli
 Giampiero Ingrassia as Pietro Corradi

See also
 List of Christmas films

References

External links 

2010s buddy comedy films
Italian buddy comedy films
Films about drugs
Italian Christmas comedy films
2010s Christmas comedy films
Films directed by Volfango De Biasi
2010s Italian-language films
2010s Italian films